Wakíŋyaŋ is a Lakota word for "thunder." It also may be a portmanteau word which associates "wahka" ("sacred") and "kinyan" ("wings").

The word is usually translated as "Thunder Spirits", "Thunder Beings," or "Thunder Birds".   Heyokas, that is contrarians, dream of Wakinyan and can burn cedar (Juniperus scopulorum) to protect themselves from thunder and lightning, since Wakinyan respects and will not harm that tree.

References

Lakota mythology
Lakota culture
Thunder gods
Lakota words and phrases